Middle East Bank (MEB) is an Iranian bank headquartered in Tehran. The bank was founded in 2012.

MEB is owned by small private shareholders. They focus on the humanitarian trade with Iran.

On 8 October 2020 OFAC (U.S. Department of the Treasury) changed its sanctions listing. Middle East Bank is - along with all other Iranian banks - SDN-listed and “Subject to Secondary Sanctions”. It is however one of the few banks tagged "IRAN" (categorization as an Iranian financial institution) only and therefore maintained its SWIFT BIC. With the General License published on the same day Middle East Bank can fully maintain its support of the humanitarian business. The up-to-date sanctions status can be found at the following link: https://www.middleeastbank.de/sanktionsstatus/.

History 
Founded on 1 November 2012, the bank began operations in January 2013 and by May, 3 branches had been established with Rls.1.4 trillion in deposits. In August 2014 they became subject to US sanctions as part of the wider sanctions against Iran.

In 2018 they opened their first branch in Germany.

See also 

 Bank Markazi Iran
 Economy of Iran
 Islamic Banking
 Banking and Insurance in Iran

References

External links 

 Official website (Persian)
 Official website (English)
 State owned banks of Iran

Banks of Iran
Banks established in 2012
Iranian companies established in 2012